Ryan John Kelly is a Northern Irish singer known for being a part of the group Celtic Thunder. He has also released solo albums as well as in collaboration with Neil Byrne.

Early life and education
Born on 6 November 1978, Ryan John Kelly is from a village called The Moy, County Tyrone, Northern Ireland. He is the youngest of three children (two boys and a girl). Kelly earned two degrees from the Queen's University Belfast, being a Bachelor of Science in Accounting and a Graduate Diploma in Advanced Accounting.

Career
When he was seven, Kelly started to sing publicly. He has always had a deep passion for music and theater.

Kelly is a current member of the Irish band Celtic Thunder, but he maintains his early musical background a solo singer. His first solo album, released in 2010 is called In Time; his second, "Life", was released in 2013. With fellow Celtic Thunder singer and band member Neil Byrne, the duo have released three albums - Acoustically Irish, in 2013, and Byrne and Kelly: Live in Australia, in 2014; and Echoes in 2016

Discography 
Solo
In Time (2010)
Life (2013)

With Neil Byrne
Acoustically Irish (2013)
Byrne and Kelly: Live in Australia (2014)
Echoes (2016)
The Ballads Collection (2020)

References

 Ryan Kelly FAQ (Celtic Thunder)

1978 births
Living people
People from Moy, County Tyrone
Folk singers from Northern Ireland
Musicians from County Tyrone
Alumni of Queen's University Belfast